Decker Township is one of ten townships in Knox County, Indiana. As of the 2010 census, its population was 227 and it contained 117 housing units.

History
Decker Township is named for the Decker family of pioneer settlers.

Geography

References

External links
 Indiana Township Association
 United Township Association of Indiana

Townships in Knox County, Indiana
Townships in Indiana